Q&A ("question and answer") may refer to:

Arts and entertainment

Film and television
 Q & A (film), a 1990 American crime drama film 
 "Q&A" (The Batman), a 2004 episode of the TV series
 "Q&A" (Homeland), a 2012 episode of the TV drama 
 "Q&A" (Person of Interest), a 2015 episode of the TV drama 
 "Q&A" (Star Trek: Short Treks), a 2019 episode of the TV series
 Q&A (American talk show)
 Q+A (Australian talk show)
 Q+A, New Zealand talk show

Other uses in arts and entertainment
 Q & A (novel), by Vikas Swarup, 2005
 Q and A (manga), a 2009 Japanese manga series

Other uses
 Q&A software, online software that attempts to answer questions asked by users
 Q&A (Symantec), database and word processing software 
 "Q&A" (song), by Cherry Bullet, 2019
 Q&A comedy website

See also
 
 
 
 QA (disambiguation)
 Qaa (disambiguation)
 Question and Answer (disambiguation)
 Questions and answers (disambiguation)
 FAQ, frequently asked questions
 Quiz, a form of game or mind sport 
 QANDA, an AI-based learning platform
 Comparison of Q&A sites